The Morean Arts Center (formerly known as The Arts Center) in St. Petersburg, Florida displays works by local, national and international artists. Past displays have included artists' works by Jasper Johns, Duncan McClellan, Allison Massari, Peter Max, Babs Reingold, Águeda Sanfiz, and Jun Kaneko. Art classes are also offered. The Morean Arts Center is located at 719 Central Avenue, with two additional exhibits in St. Petersburg: the Chihuly Collection, located at 720 Central Avenue, and the Morean Center for Clay, located at 420 22nd Street South.

History
The Morean Arts Center, with roots dating back to 1917 as the Art Club of St. Petersburg, focuses on an innovative, community-oriented approach to art and art education. Classes and outreach programs are designed to bring out the artist in all of us. The Morean offers adult programs, kids’ programs, family programs, early childhood programs, and summer camp programs, attracting beginners and advanced students alike. Primary outreach programs are geared towards youth - many of whom are at risk.

The Bank of America Children’s Learning Center is located at the Morean as well as the Glass Studio & Hot Shop. The Glass Studio & Hotshop provides working space for glass artists, audience seating to watch glassblowing in action, and teaching facilities for studio classes and workshops. Visitors can also try glassblowing themselves and purchase original glass art created by local and regional artists in the Hot Shop retail store.

The Morean Center for Clay moved to a renovated space at the Historic Train Station in 2009. Built as the Seaboard Train Station in 1926, this historic building now houses studios for 42 working artists, 6 accomplished Artists-in-Residence, two rotating galleries, classrooms, and a beautiful, 3,500 sq/ft event space. On the grounds, there is a large kiln complex, complete with: 4 (four) wood kilns, 2 (two) gas kilns, and a soda kiln. Visitors are welcome to tour the facility, Tuesday through Saturday. There are also hands-on activities and historic tours available by appointment only. The building includes a retail store with a wide variety of Chihuly merchandise. In August 2016, the collection relocated from 400 Beach Drive to 720 Central Avenue, adjacent to the Morean Arts Center.

Glass robbery
On the morning of February 8, 2016, employees at the Chihuly Collection found that a small piece, "Cobalt and Lavender Piccolo Venetian with Gilded Handles", had been stolen. The piece is valued at $25,000. The next morning the vessel was dropped off in the entryway of the Morean Arts Center; it had been wrapped in bubble wrap and placed in a box.

Creating virtually
The Morean Arts Center has a YouTube Channel: Morean Arts Center. On this channel there are creation prompts for artists, virtual tours hosted by assistant curators, and videos advertising current exhibits, resident artists, and offerings.

Footnotes

External links
 
 YouTube Channel

Arts centers in Florida
Museums in St. Petersburg, Florida
Art museums and galleries in Florida
Art museums established in 1917
1917 establishments in Florida